Old Stone House is a historic home located at Morgantown, Monongalia County, West Virginia. The original section was built about 1796, and is a two-story stone structure measuring 26 feet, 8 inches, by 20 feet, 8 inches.  A one-story, timber-frame addition built in the early 1900s and measures 16 feet, 7 inches, by 16 feet, 4 inches. The Old Stone House was the home of John W. Thompson, a potter in early Morgan's Town. He was able to create red ware and stoneware pots from the clay found in the basement of the house. It is one of the oldest surviving examples of rustic pioneer architecture in Monongalia County.  In 1935, it became headquarters of the Morgantown Service League, who operates a gift shop in the house.

It was listed on the National Register of Historic Places in 1972. It is located in the Downtown Morgantown Historic District, listed in 1996.

See also
List of the oldest buildings in West Virginia

References

Houses completed in 1796
Houses in Morgantown, West Virginia
Houses on the National Register of Historic Places in West Virginia
Stone houses in West Virginia
National Register of Historic Places in Monongalia County, West Virginia
Individually listed contributing properties to historic districts on the National Register in West Virginia
1796 establishments in Virginia